Atomsko sklonište (trans. Atomic Shelter) is a Croatian hard rock band, formed in Pula in 1977. The band is known primarily for its strong anti-war lyrics.

History

1977–1987

The band's history begins in 1968, when a play titled Atomsko sklonište and directed by Boško Obradović premiered in People's Theatre in Pula. The play featured a choice of the world anti-war poetry, including two of Obradović's poems: Kuga u Danangu (against Vietnam War) and Vaclavske Namjesti (against Warsaw Pact invasion of Czechoslovakia). For several years Obradović had an idea of a rock band performing songs featuring his lyrics, and in 1977, in front of the kafana Jadran in Pula, which was a gathering place for local musicians, he offered his lyrics to a group of musicians. The agreement was soon made, and the band Atomsko Sklonište was officially formed on February 26, 1977. The first lineup of the band featured Bruno Langer (a former Beat Stones, Fantomi, Logaritmi, and Boomerang member, bass guitar), Sergio Blažić (vocals), Dragan Gužvan (guitar), Eduard Kancelar (keyboards), Saša Dadić (drums), and Rudolf Grum (backing vocals). Blažić, Gužvan and Dadić previously performed together in the band Hush.

The made their first success with a performance on the 1977 BOOM Festival in Novi Sad. In the spring of 1978 they performed at Festival Omladina, and during the same year their debut album Ne cvikaj, generacijo (Don't Be Afraid, My Generation) was released. The album featured hard rock sound, with anti-war and cataclysmic lyrics, heavily inspired by hippie ideology, which even in Yugoslavia had already been discarded. The album brought hits "Pomorac sam, majko", "Kinematograf našeg detinjstva" and "Ne cvikaj, generacijo". The band gained the publics attention with the statements that they perform punk, unusual clothing style and photographs made by the photographer Tone Stojko from Maribor. The band would later record music for the song "Zaspao si u mojoj kosi", released by Stojko's wife Neca Falk.

The band's second album, Infarkt (Heart Attack) was released with a book of photographs by Stojko, and featured hits "Pakleni vozači" and "Djevojka br. 8". After the album release Kancelar left the band due to his studies, and was replaced by Paul Bilandžić. The band maintained their popularity on their live appearances which featured unusual scenery, such as barbed wire, and during a concert in Tivoli Hall in Ljubljana there were three hundred yellow umbrellas opened above the stage, referring to the band's song "Žuti kišobran" (Yellow Umbrella). The band gained a loyal fanbase, although the critics generally did not like the lyrics written by Obradović. The band recorded their third album U vremenu horoskopa (During the Time of Horoscope) on the peninsula Stoja near Pula, in the Mobile One mobile studio, previously used by AC/DC. The album was produced by John Etchells and Bill Ainsworth. At the time Bilandžić left the band ant formed the band Lilihip, and Atomsko sklonište continued as a quartet.

In 1980 the band recorded the live album Atomska trilogija (Nuclear Trilogy) on a concert in Dom JNA in Pula. In 1981 they released their fourth studio album Extrauterina (Ectopic Pregnancy), recorded with Etchells and Ainsworth as the producers in the Super Bear Studio, located in a monastery in the French Alps, and previously used by Elton John, Kate Bush, Pink Floyd, and  Van Morrison. The album featured the band's new drummer Zdravko Širola. After the album was released the band ended their cooperation with Boško Obradović.

Langer became the band leader and the songwriter. In 1982 the band released the album Mentalna higijena (Mental Hygiene), recorded at the JAM Studio in London. The album featured Mel Collins on saxophone as a guest. During the same year the band went to Florida, where they recorded the album Space Generation for the foreign market. The album featured nine old Atomsko sklonište songs with English language lyrics written by Dražen Met Premet. The band released the album through EEC under the name Atomic Shelter. In 1984 the band released the album Zabranjeno snivanje (Forbidden Dreaming). The live album Jednom u životu (Once in a Lifetime), recorded on the concert held at Tašmajdan Stadium on September 15, 1984, and released in 1985, was the last album featuring Blažić on vocals. The band had the last performance with him on July 21, 1986, after which he died on January 18, 1987.

In 1986 Langer and Gužvan recorded the English language album This Spaceship and released it under the name Atomic Shelter. The album featured American musicians Wes Talton (vocals), Freddie Stuckey (keyboards) and David Pressley (drums). The album featured six old rerecorded Atomsko sklonište songs and four new songs.

1987–present
At the end of 1987 Atomsko sklonište continued performing in the new lineup: Langer (vocals and bass guitar), Ranko Svorcan (guitar) and Nikola Duraković (drums). In 1990 the band released the album Criminal Tango. In August 1991, at the time when military conflicts in Yugoslavia had already begun, Atomsko sklonište performed on Gitarijada festival in Zaječar, Serbia. In 1992 the band released the album East Europe Man, featuring Wes Talon on vocals. The song "Chinese Bike" entered the Billboard Hot 100. In 1995 the band released the studio album Terra Mistica. In 1999 Nikola Duraković was replaced by Stjepan Bobić (a former Nola, The Spoons, and Messerschmitt member).

In 2003 One Records released the DVD entitled Atomsko sklonište, which features a collection of their videos and a recording of their performance at the 1991 Gitarijada festival.

Legacy
The album Ne cvikaj, generacijo was polled in 1998 as 47th on the list of 100 greatest Yugoslav popular music albums in the book YU 100: najbolji albumi jugoslovenske rok i pop muzike (YU 100: The Best albums of Yugoslav pop and rock music).

Band members 

Current members
 Bruno Langer – lead vocals, bass (1977–present)
 Matija Dadić – guitar (2018–present)
 Eric Vojak  – drums (2018–present)

Former members
 Sergio Blažić – lead vocals (1977–1986; died 1986)
 Saša Dadić  – drums (1977–1981)
 Dragan Gužvan – guitar (1977–1987)
 Eduard Kancelar – keyboard (1977–1978)
 Rudolf Grum – backing vocals (1978)
 Paul Bilandžić – keyboard (1978-1980)

 Zdravko Širola – drums, keyboard (1981-1987)
 Nikola Duraković – drums (1987-1999)
 Ranko Švorcan – guitar (1987-2018)
 Stjepan Bobić – drums (1987-2018)
 Aleks Černjul – guitar (1990-2020)

Timeline

Discography

 Studio albums 
Ne cvikaj, generacijo (1978)
Infarkt (1978)
U vremenu horoskopa (1980)
Extrauterina (1981)
Mentalna higijena (1982)
Space Generation (as Atomic Shelter, 1983)
Zabranjeno snivanje (1984)
This Spaceship (as Atomic Shelter, 1987)
Criminal Tango (1990)
East Europe Man (as Atomic Shelter, 1992)
Terra Mistica (1995)

 Live albums 
Atomska trilogija (1980)
Jednom u životu (1985)
Oni što dolaze za nama (2020)

 Compilations 
1976 - 1986 (1996)
'76 - '86 Kolekcija hitova Vol.2

 Video albums 
Atomsko sklonište (2003)

References

External links

EX YU ROCK enciklopedija 1960-2006, Janjatović Petar; 

Musical groups established in 1977
Croatian rock music groups
Yugoslav hard rock musical groups
Pula